Vitālijs Dolgopolovs (born 3 October 1973) is a retired Latvian football midfielder.

References

1973 births
Living people
Latvian footballers
FK Liepājas Metalurgs players
FK Ventspils players
Association football midfielders
Latvia international footballers